Cicero March is a 1966 short documentary film made by the Chicago-based production company, The Film Group. The film details a civil rights march held on September 4, 1966 in Cicero, Illinois.

The film documents Robert Lucas and fellow members of the Congress of Racial Equality (CORE) as they lead activists through Cicero to protest the city of Chicago's restrictions in housing laws. White residents of Cicero respond with vitriolic jeers as the police struggle to prevent a riot.

Cicero March was filmed after Martin Luther King Jr., James Bevel, and other Southern Christian Leadership Conference members had come to Chicago to participate in the Chicago Freedom Movement and organize a movement calling for fair housing in Chicago. Chicago city officials, including Mayor Richard J. Daley, negotiated a Fair Housing agreement with Dr. King, Bevel, and others in August, and King and Bevel agreed to end demonstrations. Nevertheless, Robert Lucas and other members of CORE felt that the march was strategically necessary and proceeded with it anyway.

Cicero March is one of a seven part module or educational film series ("The Urban Crisis and the New Militants") produced by The Film Group that, "teach by raising questions rather than by attempting to answer them." The modules tell their story through editing rather than voice-over narration and show "real events, with real people acting spontaneously," as the Film Group explained to NewenhouseNovo, a now defunct educational film distributor.

The 16mm film prints and elements for Cicero March reside at Chicago Film Archives within the Film Group Collection. In 2013 Cicero March was added to the National Film Registry.

See also
 Civil rights movement in popular culture
 List of American films of 1966

References

External links 
Cicero March essay by Nancy Watrous on the National Film Registry website. 

Streaming Version of Cicero March

Documentary films about the civil rights movement
American short documentary films
1966 documentary films
1966 films
United States National Film Registry films
Cicero, Illinois
Documentary films about Illinois
1960s American films
1960s short documentary films